The 2019 Postnord UCI WWT Vårgårda West Sweden was a women's bicycle race and was the 18th round of the 2019 UCI Women's World Tour. It was held on 18 August 2019, in Vårgårda, Sweden, the day after the 2019 Postnord UCI WWT Vårgårda West Sweden TTT.

The road race covered 145.3 km starting and finishing in Vårgårda and included eight gravel sections.

Teams

Fifteen professional teams, and two national teams, each with a maximum of six riders, started the race:

 

National teams: 
 Sweden
 Norway

Results

External links

References

Open de Suède Vårgårda
Postnord UCI WWT Vargarda
Postnord UCI WWT Vargarda
UCI Women's World Tour races
Postnord UCI WWT Vargarda